The 1962 Merdeka Tournament was the fifth edition of the annual football tournament hosted by Malaya.  It took place from September 8 to September 19 with nine participating nations.

Teams 
Thailand withdrew on August 31.  Israel were originally invited but the invitation was later rescinded on September 3.  All participating teams are the national teams except for South Korea.  They was represented by a reserve team with some senior players, which flew directly from Seoul.  Their senior national team returned home after finishing second in the Asian Games in Jakarta on September 4.

Group stage

Group A

Group B

Third place play-off

Final

References 

Merd
Merdeka Tournament, 1962
Merdeka Cup
September 1962 sports events in Asia